Florence (O'odham: S-auppag) is a town,  southeast of Phoenix, in Pinal County, Arizona, United States. Florence, which is the county seat of Pinal County, is one of the oldest towns in that county and is regarded as a National Historic District with over 25 buildings listed on the National Register of Historic Places. The population of Florence was 26,785 at the 2020 census.

History
The area where the current town of Florence is located was once inhabited by the Hohokam, ancestors of the O'odham people. Prior to the establishment of the town, the Gila River served as a part of the border between the United States and Mexico. In 1853, the Gadsden Purchase extended American territory well south of the Gila.

Levi Ruggles, a veteran of the American Civil War, founded the town of Florence on the south bank of the Gila River. He came to Arizona Territory in 1866 as a U.S. Indian Agent. Recognizing the agricultural potential of the valley, he found an easily fordable crossing on the Gila River and surveyed a townsite there. With the aid of Governor R.C. McCormick, he secured a post office in August of the same year. Ruggles held numerous public offices including that of Territorial Legislator. Florence became the county seat in the newly formed Pinal County. Silver was discovered in 1875 in the nearby mountains which led to the creation of the famous Silver King Mine.

Adamsville
In 1870, Fred Adams founded a farming community two miles west of the original Florence townsite. The farming town had stores, homes, a post office, a flour mill, and water tanks, It was named Adamsville. In the 1900s (decade), the Gila River overflowed after a storm and ran over its banks. Most of the small town was wiped out and the residents moved to Florence. The area where the town was established is now a ghost town and is currently within the boundaries of Florence. At the junction of Highway 79 and 287 there is a historical marker about Adamsville.

A canal was built in the 1880s which enabled water from the Gila River to be diverted for irrigation. Farming and ranching then played a major role in Florence's economy. All of the federal land transactions for Southern Arizona were conducted in Florence until 1881, when the Federal Land Office was moved to Tucson.

Tunnel Saloon Gabriel-Phy shootout of 1888
One of the most notable gunfights in the Old Southwest occurred in Florence. Sheriff Pete Gabriel hired thirty-nine year old Joseph (Joe) Phy as his deputy in 1883. Gabriel decided to not run for sheriff in 1886 and supported his deputy Phy for the job. Later Gabriel withdrew his support because of personal differences with Phy. The two friends became bitter enemies and had a confrontation on May 31, 1888 in the Tunnel Saloon. A gunfight ensued and spread to the street. Both men received gunshot wounds. Phy died a few hours after the gunfight, but Gabriel survived the encounter and died 10 years later.

Second Pinal County Courthouse
The second Pinal County Courthouse was built in 1891. It was the site where the trials of three notorious women were presented. They were Pearl Heart, Eva Dugan and Winnie Ruth Judd, known as the "Trunk Murderess". Pearl Hart (birth surname: Taylor) was an outlaw of the American Old West. She committed one of the last recorded stagecoach robberies in the United States; her crime gained notoriety primarily because of her gender. She was tried in 1899 and was acquitted, however the judge ordered a second trial and she was found guilty and sentenced to five years in prison.

In the 1930s Eva Dugan was convicted of murder. She was sentenced to be executed by hanging. However, it resulted in her decapitation and influenced the State of Arizona to replace hanging with the gas chamber as a method of execution.

Winnie Ruth Judd was a Phoenix medical secretary who was found guilty of murdering and dismembering her friends Agnes Anne LeRoi and Hedvig Samuelson over the alleged affections of her lover Jack Halloran. The jury found her guilty of first-degree murder on February 8, 1932. An appeal was unsuccessful. Her trial was marked by sensationalized newspaper coverage and suspicious circumstances. Judd was sentenced to be hanged February 17, 1933, and sent to the Arizona State Prison in Florence. The sentence she received raised debate about capital punishment. Her death sentence was overturned after a ten-day hearing found her mentally incompetent; she was then sent to Arizona State Asylum for the Insane on April 24, 1933.

Tom Mix Monument
In 1940, the cowboy movie star Tom Mix was killed when he lost control of his speeding Cord Phaeton convertible and rolled into a dry wash (now called the Tom Mix Wash) in Florence, Arizona. Mix, who was a regular tenant in the Ross/Fryer–Cushman House, was returning to Florence from Tucson. There is a 2-foot–tall iron statue of a riderless horse with a plaque on the site of the accident.

Geography and climate
Florence is located at  (33.042204, −111.384521).

The town has the typical hot desert climate of lowland Arizona, with sweltering hot summers and mild winters. Like most of Arizona, Florence receives half of its average summer rainfall in the months of July, August, and September, during the North American monsoon season, with August being the wettest month. Thunderstorms occur in the late afternoon to evening hours, as well as the early night hours, bringing heavy downpours, thunder, lightning, blowing dust, and the risk of flash flooding. The winter months of December, January, and February bring the other half of the yearly rainfall to the town from winter storms that move in from the Pacific Ocean. December is the second wettest month in Florence.

Demographics

As of 2015, there were 30,770 people, and 6,832 households in the town. There were 9,319 housing units in an incorporated are of 8.8 square miles. The racial makeup of the town was 82.2% White, 6.0% Black or African American, 4.5% Native American, 1.0% Asian, 0.3% Pacific Islander, 4.1% from other races, and 2.0% from two or more races. 36.7% of the population were Hispanic or Latino of any race.

There were 6,832 households, out of which 22.7% had children under the age of 18 living with them, 53.3% were married couples living together, 9.5% had a female householder with no husband present, and 33.6% were non-families. 28.2% of all households were made up of individuals, and 12.2% had someone living alone who was 65 years of age or older. The average household size was 2.48 and the average family size was 3.06.

In the town, the population was spread out, with 13.2% under the age of 18, 86.8% from 18 years and over, and 17.5% who were 65 years of age or older. The median age was 40 years.

The median income for a household in the town was $47,891. About 12.3% of families and 16.8% of the population were below the poverty line, including 24.7% of those under age 18 and 10.6% of those age 65 or over.

Prisons 

As of 2016 Florence is home to multiple state, federal, county and private prisons:
 Arizona State Prison Complex – Florence, run by the Arizona Department of Corrections, housing Arizona state prisoners, the former Arizona State Prison, and location of Arizona's execution chamber
 Arizona State Prison Complex – Eyman, run by the Arizona Department of Corrections, housing Arizona state prisoners and Arizona's death row
 Arizona State Prison Florence-West, operated by the GEO Group, housing Arizona state prisoners
 Central Arizona Correctional Facility, operated by the GEO Group, housing Arizona state prisoners
 Central Arizona Detention Center, run by Corrections Corporation of America, housing prisoners for the United States Marshals Service, TransCor America LLC, U.S. Immigration and Customs Enforcement, Pascua Yaqui Tribe government, and the United States Air Force
 Florence Correctional Center, run by CCA, houses inmates for U.S. Immigration and Customs Enforcement, for the Vermont Department of Corrections, and for the United States Marshals Service.
 The Pinal County Adult Detention Center, operated by the county, housing local prisoners
 The Pinal County Youth Justice Center, operated by the county, housing local juvenile prisoners

Located just north of Florence during World War II was a large prisoner of war camp for German and Italian prisoners of war, mainly captured during the North Africa campaign, called Camp Florence on 500 acres of land.  Japanese Americans arrested as "enemy aliens" after the U.S. entered the war, were also interned nearby at the Gila River War Relocation Center. The prisoners were paid 50 cents an hour to pick cotton. The men were not allowed to buy cigarettes with their prison wages. However, they could buy tobacco which they rolled themselves. McFarland State Historic Park  on Ruggles Ave. has a display and information on this period of Arizona history.

Transportation
The City of Coolidge operates Central Arizona Regional Transit (CART), which provides transportation between Florence, Coolidge, Central Arizona College and Casa Grande.

Miscellaneous
Florence is considered the hub of Pinal County filled with historic buildings and rich history.
 Florence is the location of the 2nd Anthem development in the state of Arizona being built by Pulte and Del Webb. It is located six miles to the northwest of downtown historic Florence.
 The town's preserved Main Street and open desert scenery were the setting of the motion picture Murphy's Romance.
 Florence is the host of the annual "Country Thunder" music festival.
 The town is also the home of the Florence Jr. Parada Rodeo, the oldest junior rodeo in the United States.
 Florence is considered to be the hometown of Adolfo “Harpo” Celaya, a World War II veteran who is one of the  survivors. In 2017 Celaya was honored as the Florence Post Office was dedicated in his name.

Points of interest
 McFarland State Historic Park – The first Pinal County Courthouse was built in 1876 and is located at W. 24 Ruggle St. in the McFarland State Historic Park.
 St. Anthony's Greek Orthodox Monastery was established in 1995 by Elder Ephraim of Arizona, a Greek Orthodox priest and monk.
 Florence High School – The high school was built in 1887 and is located in 1000 S. Main St. Listed in the National Register of Historic Places on June 22, 1987, reference #87001306.
 Poston Butte – The pyramid tomb of Charles Debrille Poston, known as "The Father of Arizona" is located on Primrose Hill which was renamed Poston Butte.

Historic properties
Florence has various historic structures. Some are listed in the National Register of Historic Places while others are considered historical by the Florence Historic District Advisory Commission.

References

External links

 Town of Florence official website
 Florence Named NerdWallet's #1 City on the Rise in Arizona

 
Towns in Pinal County, Arizona
County seats in Arizona
Phoenix metropolitan area